Japonski Island is a small island in the city of Sitka in the Alexander Archipelago of southeastern Alaska, United States. It lies across the Sitka Channel from Sitka's central business district.

The Russian colonists named the island Japonski (Russian for "Japanese") after some Japanese fishermen who were stranded there in 1805 (unnamed Russians returned them to Yezo (Hokkaidō) in 1806).

Japonski Island is connected to Baranof Island and Sitka by the O'Connell Bridge. Before the bridge there was a ferry system similar to that which currently exists in Ketchikan. The shore boats that maintained the transportation link between Japonski and the rest of Sitka were the Donna, Teddy, Dorothy, Diane, and Arrowhead.  They carried approximately 1000 passengers a day from 1946 to 1972.

Japonski Island is home to Sitka Rocky Gutierrez Airport; the Sitka branch campus of the University of Alaska Southeast; Mt. Edgecumbe High School — a state-run boarding school for rural Alaskans; the Indian Health Service regional hospital SEARHC (SouthEast Alaska Regional Healthcare Center); a United States Coast Guard air station; the port and facilities for the USCGC Kukui; and the restored boathouse maintained by the Sitka Maritime Heritage Society. Besides the Coast Guard housing complex, there are very few Sitkans who live on Japonski Island. The official population was 269 persons at the 2000 census.

Demographics 

Japonski Island appeared once separately on the 1940 U.S. Census as an unincorporated village. It was later annexed into Sitka.

References 

Japonski Island and connected smaller islands: Block Group 6, Census Tract 2, Sitka City and Borough, Alaska United States Census Bureau

Islands of the Alexander Archipelago
Islands of Sitka, Alaska
Islands of Alaska